Beaver Brook is a small community in the Canadian province of Nova Scotia, located  in Colchester County. It is a mainly rural community with one small saw mill. Beaver Brook is located on the 236 Highway just west of the community of Old Barns. The "Beaver Brook" runs through the community's farm fields and finally into the Cobequid Bay at the headwaters of the Bay of Fundy.

The land is gently rolling, glaciated hills with fertile soils.

Dairy farming is the main agriculture industry in Beaver Brook. Corn and soy beans are the main crops.

Eagles from Cobequid Bay and the close by Shubenacadie River often fly over Beaver Brook. Hawks are common as well as foxes.

Nova Scotia Route 236 is a busy road that is a shorter route to Windsor, NS, the beginning of the Annapolis Valley

Many of the residents of Beaver Brook work in Truro, a fifteen-minute drive away.

References
Beaver Brook on Destination Nova Scotia

Communities in Colchester County
General Service Areas in Nova Scotia